The Kyoto Prize in Basic Sciences is awarded once a year by the Inamori Foundation. The Prize is one of three Kyoto Prize categories; the others are the Kyoto Prize in Advanced Technology and the Kyoto Prize in Arts and Philosophy. The first Kyoto Prize in Basic Sciences was awarded to Claude Elwood Shannon, the “Establishment of Mathematical Foundation of Information Theory”. The Prize is widely regarded as the most prestigious award available in fields which are traditionally not honored with a Nobel Prize.

Fields 
The Kyoto Prize in Basic Sciences is awarded on a rotating basis to researchers in the following four fields: 
 Mathematical sciences (including pure mathematics)
 Biological sciences (evolution, behavior, ecology, environment)
 Earth and planetary sciences, astronomy and astrophysics
 Cognitive science/Life sciences (molecular biology, cell biology, neurobiology)

Laureates 
Source: Kyoto Prize

Biological sciences

Mathematical sciences

Earth and planetary sciences, astronomy and astrophysics

Life sciences

Cognitive science

See also 
 Kyoto Prize
 Kyoto Prize in Advanced Technology
 Kyoto Prize in Arts and Philosophy
 List of Kyoto Prize winners
 List of astronomy awards
 List of biology awards
 List of mathematics awards

References 

Kyoto Prize
Science and technology awards
Mathematics awards
Biology awards
Astronomy prizes
 
Space-related awards